WHJA (890 AM, "Power 101") is a radio station licensed to the community of Laurel, Mississippi, and serving the Hattiesburg, Mississippi, area. The station is owned by Donald Pugh, Sr., through licensee Eternity Media Group LLC. It airs a classic hip hop format.

The station was assigned the WHJA call letters by the Federal Communications Commission on August 1, 2008.

The station has been silent since August 25, 2008. According to the station's application to the FCC for authority to remain silent, the station suffered a "massive transmitter failure" and they claim that "repair of the facility may not be economically feasible." The application notes that the financial performance of the station is being assessed "in light of the needed technical expenditures."

Station returned to the air in June 2013.

History
The station began as WQIS "Q-89" in 1985 when WQIS moved from 1260 kHz to occupy the present transmitter tower, in Moselle, Mississippi; once occupied by sister station WNSL-FM. Q-89 was a daytime only R&B station serving Laurel and Hattiesburg; the station changed the format to easy listening and became "Kiss 890" in the 1990s. After Clear Channel Communications acquired WQIS, the call letters were changed. The original WEEZ call letters were assigned to FM 99.3 as an easy listening/soft rock station operated by WAML in the 1980s. In the 1990s, WEEZ changed to gospel music and became known as "Gospel 99". The call letters at 99.3 MHz changed to WHER "Eagle 99" playing classic rock following the acquisition by Clear Channel.

The station's license has been through a series of changes since 2010. On April 6, 2011, Clear Channel donated WHJA to the Minority Media and Telecommunications Council (MMTC). On May 1, 2013, MMTC sold the station to Donald H. Pugh, Jr. for $5,000. Pugh, Jr. subsequently assigned the station's license to Donald Pugh, Sr. on January 22, 2014.

On January 23, 2017, WHJA changed their format from urban gospel to classic hip hop, branded as "Power 101" (simulcast on Fm translator W266CT 101.1 FM Laurel.

Effective March 2, 2018, Donald Pugh, Sr. transferred the station's license to his wholly owned Eternity Media Group LLC.

References

External links

HJA
Jones County, Mississippi
1957 establishments in Mississippi
Radio stations established in 1957
Classic hip hop radio stations in the United States
HJA